William Gough (20 October 1929 – 14 August 1978) was a New Zealand cricketer. He played one first-class match for Otago in 1953/54.

Gough was born at Dunedin in 1929 and educated at Otago Boys' High School. He worked as a clerk.

References

External links
 

1929 births
1978 deaths
New Zealand cricketers
Otago cricketers
Cricketers from Dunedin